Pablo Perez may refer to:
 Pablo Pérez Álvarez (born 1969), Venezuelan politician
 Pablo Pérez Companc (born 1982), Argentine racing driver
 Pablo Pérez (footballer, born 1993), Spanish footballer
 Pablo Pérez (footballer, born 1985), Argentine footballer
 Battle of Pablo Perez, 1816 battle between Portugal and Banda Oriental